Moldenhauer is a German surname. Notable people with the surname include:

Ernst Moldenhauer, German fencer
Hans Moldenhauer (1901–1929), German tennis player
Hans Moldenhauer (1906–1987), German-American collector, musician and philanthropist. Founder of the Moldenhauer Archives of the Library of Congress
Hans-Georg Moldenhauer (born 1941), German footballer
Henry R. Moldenhauer (1855-1925), American politician and businessman
Joanne Moldenhauer (1928–2016), American high school mathematics teacher
Paul Moldenhauer (1876–1947), German Finance Minister, economist and politician
Siegfried Moldenhauer (1915–1998), German military officer

German-language surnames